Milan Stupar  (born January 9, 1980) is a Serbian footballer.

Career
He started playing as a teenager in his hometown club FK Begej Žitište and soon caught the attention of the nearest top league club, FK Proleter Zrenjanin. Next he moved to Belgrade's OFK Belgrade where he stayed one season. In 1999, he signed with FK Budućnost Banatski Dvor. In the 2005-06 season, the club will merge with his previous club, FK Proleter, and change the name to FK Banat Zrenjanin. He played in the club until 2008, when moved to Premier League of Bosnia and Herzegovina club FK Borac Banja Luka.

External links
 Profile at Srbijafudbal
 Profile at Playerhistory 
 Profile and stats until 2003 at Dekisa. Tripod

1980 births
Living people
Association football midfielders
Serbian footballers
FK Proleter Zrenjanin players
OFK Beograd players
FK Budućnost Banatski Dvor players
FK Banat Zrenjanin players
Serbian SuperLiga players
FK Borac Banja Luka players
Premier League of Bosnia and Herzegovina players